The 2000–01 Rochdale A.F.C. season was the club's 80th season in the Football League, and the 27th consecutive season in the fourth tier (League Division Three).

Statistics
																								

|}

Competitions

Football League Third Division

FA Cup

Football League Cup (Worthington Cup)

Football League Trophy (LDV Vans Trophy)

References

Rochdale A.F.C. seasons
2000–01 Football League Third Division by team